Arthur I (29 March 1187 – presumably 1203) was 4th Earl of Richmond and Duke of Brittany between 1196 and 1203. He was the posthumous son of Geoffrey II, Duke of Brittany, and Constance, Duchess of Brittany. His father, Geoffrey, was the son of Henry II, King of England.

In 1190 Arthur was designated heir to the throne of England and its French territory by his uncle, Richard I, the intent being that Arthur would succeed Richard in preference to Richard's younger brother John. Nothing is recorded of Arthur after his incarceration in Rouen Castle in 1203, and while his precise fate is unknown, it is generally believed he was killed by John.

Early life
Arthur was born in 1187, the son of Duchess Constance and Duke Geoffrey II of Brittany, who died before he was born. As an infant, Arthur was second in line to the succession of his paternal grandfather King Henry II of England, after his uncle Richard. King Henry died when Arthur was 2 years old, and Richard I became the new king in his place.

While Richard was away on the Third Crusade, Arthur's mother Constance sought to make the Duchy of Brittany more independent. On 11 November 1190, Arthur was named as Richard's heir presumptive and was betrothed to a daughter of King Tancred of Sicily as part of their treaty. However, Emperor Henry VI conquered the Kingdom of Sicily in 1194, so the betrothal of Arthur came to nothing.

A marriage plan, originally aiming to establish an alliance between King Richard and King Philip II of France to marry Arthur's elder sister Eleanor to Philip's son Louis also failed. In 1196, Constance had the young Arthur proclaimed Duke of Brittany and her co-ruler as a child of nine years. The same year, Richard summoned Arthur, as well as Arthur's mother, Constance, to Normandy, but Ranulf de Blondeville, 6th Earl of Chester, stepfather of Arthur, abducted Constance. Richard marched to Brittany to rescue Arthur, who was then secretly carried to France to be brought up with Louis.

When Richard died on 6 April 1199, on his deathbed he proclaimed his brother John as his heir, fearing Arthur was too young to look after the throne. Arthur was only twelve years old at the time and under the influence of the French king. John immediately claimed the throne of England, but much of the French nobility were resentful at recognising him as their overlord. They preferred Arthur, who declared himself vassal of Philip. Philip recognised Arthur's right to Anjou, Maine, and Poitou. Upon Richard's death Arthur led a force to Anjou and Maine. From 18 April, he styled himself as Duke of Brittany, Count of Anjou and Earl of Richmond.

On 18 September, John persuaded the seneschal of Anjou, William des Roches, to defect, claiming Arthur would be a Capetian puppet. Four days later William took Arthur and Constance prisoners to Le Mans. Viscount Aimery, the seneschal appointed by John, took Arthur and Constance and fled the court to Angers, and later the court of Philip II.

Treaty of Le Goulet
The Treaty of Le Goulet was signed by the kings John of England and Philip II of France in May 1200 and meant to settle once and for all the claims the Norman kings of England had as Norman dukes on French lands, including, at least for a time, Brittany. Under the terms of the treaty, Philip recognised John as King of England as heir of his brother Richard I and thus formally abandoned any support for Arthur. John, meanwhile, recognised Philip as the suzerain of continental possessions of the Angevin Empire.

Philip had previously recognised John as suzerain of Anjou and the Duchy of Brittany, but with this he extorted 20,000 marks sterling in payment for recognition of John's sovereignty of Brittany.

Battle against John of England

After the signing of the Treaty of Le Goulet, and feeling offended by Philip, Arthur fled to John, his uncle, and was treated kindly, at least initially. However, he later became suspicious of John and fled back to Angers. Some unidentified source said that in April 1202, Arthur was again betrothed, this time to Marie of France, a daughter of Philip II and Agnes of Andechs-Merania.

After his return to France, and with the support of Philip II, Arthur embarked on a campaign in Normandy against John in 1202. Poitou revolted in support of Arthur. The Duke of Brittany besieged his grandmother, Eleanor of Aquitaine, John's mother, in the Château de Mirebeau. John marched on Mirebeau, taking Arthur by surprise on 31 July 1202. Arthur was captured by John's barons on 1 August, and imprisoned in the Château de Falaise in Falaise, Normandy.

Imprisonment and disappearance
Arthur was guarded by Hubert de Burgh at the Chateau de Falaise. According to contemporaneous chronicler Ralph of Coggeshall, John ordered two of his servants to blind and castrate the duke. De Burgh could not bring himself to let Arthur be mutilated. Fearful of John, de Burgh leaked news that Arthur had died of natural causes. This news infuriated Brittany, who suspected that Arthur had been murdered. The following year Arthur was transferred to Rouen, under the charge of William de Braose. Arthur vanished in April 1203, in the background of several military victories by Philip II of France against King John.

Arthur's disappearance gave rise to various stories. One account was that Arthur's gaolers feared to harm him, and so he was murdered by John directly and his body dumped in the Seine. The Margam Annals provide the following account of Arthur's death:

William de Braose is also rumoured to have murdered Arthur. After the young man's disappearance, he rose high in John's favour receiving new lands and titles in the Welsh Marches. Many years after Arthur's disappearance, and just prior to a conflict with King John, de Braose's wife Maud de Braose accused the king of murdering Arthur. 

Not only the Bretons, but even Philip II, were ignorant of what actually happened, and whether Arthur was alive or dead. Whatever his fate, Arthur left no known issue. William promised to direct the attack of Mirebeau on condition he was consulted on the fate of Arthur, but John broke the promise, causing him to leave John along with Aimeri of Thouars and siege Angers.

Succession
The mystery surrounding Arthur's death complicated his succession. This succession was presumably influenced by both King John and King Philip II. There were no male heirs to the ducal crown and so his succession as duke was constrained to several choices among his sisters.

His sister Eleanor, the 'Fair Maid of Brittany', was also King John's prisoner. Eleanor also presented a complicating factor, if not a threat, to John's succession plans as King of England. While permitted by John to succeed Richmond and claim her rights to Brittany, she remained imprisoned for the rest of her life, through the reign of John's actual successor, his son Henry III of England. While imprisoned, she never married and had no issue. Her imprisonment and the fact that she was located in England made it impossible for her to reign as hereditary Duchess of Brittany.

Arthur I was succeeded by his half-sister, Alix of Thouars, the daughter of Constance and her third husband Guy of Thouars.

Legacy

In literature
The death of Arthur is a vital ingredient in Shakespeare's history play The Life and Death of King John, in which Arthur is portrayed as a child whose innocence dissuades Hubert de Burgh from committing the murder demanded by King John. However, Arthur soon dies after jumping from his place of confinement in an escape attempt.

In the 19th century, the Breton poet Auguste Brizeux wrote of Arthur in La chasse du Prince Arthur.

In the novel Saving Grace by Julie Garwood, the heroine finds documents relating to Arthur's murder, committed under the orders of King John, by two of King John's barons. She is married to a Scottish Laird, Gabriel MacBain, to escape England, but is harassed by both King John's barons and the English faction hoping to take down King John, each party unsure of how much she knows.

In Randall Garrett's alternative-history fantasy stories, the Lord Darcy series, Richard does not "succumb to his illness", but survives it. John Lackland never becomes king, and the Plantagenet line, descending from Arthur, continues down to the present day.

In The Devil and King John by the Australian novelist Philip Lindsay, Arthur is killed by John in a fit of temper, but he is shown as a rebellious adolescent who did provoke John to some extent, rather than the innocent child in some versions. In his introduction, Lindsay acknowledged that he had no evidence that this is what happened to Arthur, but he considered it to be as good a guess as any.

Other literary works featuring Arthur include:
 The Troublesome Reign of King John (c.1589) anonymous tragedy
 Below the Salt (1957) novel by Thomas B. Costain
 Jean sans Terre ou la mort d’Arthur (1791) tragedy by Jean-François Ducis
 King John (1800) tragedy by Richard Valpy
 Le petit Arthur de Bretagne à la tour de Rouen (1822) poem by Marceline Desbordes-Valmore
 La Mort d’Arthur de Bretagne (1826) poem by Alexis Fossé
 Arthur de Bretagne (1824) tragedy by Joseph Chauvet
 Arthur de Bretagne (1885) drama by Louis Tiercelin
 Arthur de Bretagne (1887, posthumous) drama by Claude Bernard
 Hubert's Arthur (1935) novel by Frederick Rolfe
 Devil’s Brood (2008), Lionheart (2011) and A King’s Ransom (2014) novels by Sharon Kay Penman

In music
In 1912 the Breton composer Joseph-Guy Ropartz composed a symphonic poem, La Chasse du Prince Arthur (Prince Arthur's Hunt) after the poem by Brizeux. The Breton folk-rock band Tri Yann's 1995 album Portraits includes a song about Arthur.

On television
Arthur and his mother Constance appear as characters in a number of episodes of the 1950s British TV series The Adventures of Robin Hood. Arthur is portrayed by actors Peter Asher (three episodes, seasons one and two), Richard O'Sullivan (one episode, season three) and Jonathan Bailey (one episode, season four). Simon Gipps-Kent portrayed Arthur's life and torturous death in the 1978 BBC series The Devil's Crown.

Genealogical table

Notes

References

Sources

 Legge, M. Dominica (1982), "William the Marshal and Arthur of Brittany", Historical Research, volume 55

 Powicke, F. M. (October 1909), "King John and Arthur of Brittany", The English Historical Review, volume 24, pp. 659–674

External links

 
 

1187 births
1203 deaths
12th-century dukes of Brittany
13th-century dukes of Brittany
12th-century English nobility
13th-century English nobility
13th-century missing person cases
Anglo-Normans
Nobility from Nantes
Heirs to the English throne
Counts of Anjou
Dukes of Brittany
Earls of Richmond (1136 creation)
House of Plantagenet
Burials at Rouen Cathedral
Disappeared princes
Male Shakespearean characters
Medieval child monarchs
French prisoners and detainees
English prisoners and detainees
French prisoners of war in the 13th century
Non-inheriting heirs presumptive